This was the first edition of the tournament.

Tomislav Brkić and Nikola Ćaćić won the title after defeating Luis David Martínez and Igor Zelenay 6–2, 6–2 in the final.

Seeds

Draw

References

External links
 Main draw

Parma Challenger - Doubles